The 1946–47 Eredivisie season was the second season of the Eredivisie, the top level of ice hockey in the Netherlands. Three teams participated in the league, and T.IJ.S.C. Tilburg won the championship.

Regular season

External links
Nederlandse IJshockey Bond

Eredivisie (ice hockey) seasons
Neth
1946–47 in Dutch ice hockey